Gerhardus Petrus "Gert" Potgieter (14 November 1929 – 2 July 1977) was a South African opera tenor and actor who had a great influence on Afrikaans culture.

Early life

Born at Aasvoëlkop, a suburb of Johannesburg, on 14 November 1929, he was one of the five children of Hermanus Potgieter, a printer, and his wife Maria Naudé.

He was educated at the Laërskool (Primary School) Louw Geldenhuys  and Helpmekaar Kollege, Johannesburg, where he matriculated.

After leaving school he worked at Voortrekkerpers :af:Voortrekkerpers, a publishing firm, in Johannesburg until 1960 when he qualified as a printer.

Singing career

From the age of sixteen he took singing lessons with Kosie Boshoff and, after his voice had broken, with Beatrice Lovegrove and Alberto Terassi. When PJ Lemmer, Inspector of Music in the Orange Free State, wanted to stage a performance of the cantata Vasco da Gama in 1949; he chose Potgieter for the tenor role. This was the beginning of his singing career.

Andre Brink and Anton Hartman, head of music at the South African Broadcasting Corporation and the principal conductor of the SABC orchestra (and thus the most influential conductor in the country) gave Potgieter the opportunity of taking part in radio broadcasts and in 1960 he sang with Mimi Coertse and George Fourie in Verdi's opera, Rigoletto. In the same year he was awarded the Mimi Coertse Scholarship for singing. Towards the end of 1960 he enrolled as a student at the Vienna Opera School and took part inter alia in a performance of Gluck's Iphigénie en Tauride.

On his return to South Africa in 1962, he went back to the printing industry as a proof-reader and machine compositor. From 1966, he devoted himself to full-time singing.

He soon became known as a singer of light music and a tenor in operas. His popularity was confirmed by the several Sarie Awards he received for his records. Sarie Awards are made by the South African Recording Industry.

His greatest operatic success was in the leading role in Peter Grimes, an opera by Benjamin Britten . He also sang arias from Don Giovanni by Mozart, Cavalleria Rusticana by Mascagni, La Boheme  by Puccini and from the Afrikaans opera In die Droogte by John Joubert.

His repertoire also included extracts from the oratorios of Handel and Mendelssohn, Britten's War Requiem, and the radiophonic opera Asterion by the Dutch composer Henk Badings based on the lyrics of NP van Wyk Louw .

His powerful physique and acting ability earned him film contracts. During 1969-70 he played the leading role in the film Lied in My Hart (Song in my Heart). In Forgotten Song of Summer only his acting was used. Various recordings of his singing are available commercially and the South African Broadcasting Corporation made a number of transcription recordings.

Family life
He married Mona Dreyer of Boshof, Orange Free State, in 1952. The marriage was childless.

Death
He died on 2 July 1977 in a motorcar accident at Tarlton, Transvaal.

His sudden death was a great shock to his many fans. He had a friendly and charming disposition. His death left a void, particularly in the Afrikaans music world. Shortly before he died a programme about him, entitled GP gesels was broadcast on the Afrikaans service of the SABC.

References

External links
South African Opera Singers

1929 births
1977 deaths
South African operatic tenors
Musicians from Johannesburg
Afrikaner people
20th-century South African male opera singers